The 2011 All-Ireland Senior Club Camogie Championship for the leading clubs in the women's team field sport of camogie was won by Oulart–The Ballagh (Wx), who defeated Drom & Inch (Tip) in the final, played at Croke Park.

Arrangements
The championship was organised on the traditional provincial system used in Gaelic Games since the 1880s, with Killimor and Loughgiel winning the championships of the other two provinces. A seventh-minute goal by Mary Looby, set up by Geraldine Kinane and Niamh
Harkin helped Drom-Inch dethrone champions Killimor. Ursula Jacob scored 1-16 and Una Leacy and Aideen Brennan the second and third goals as Oulart the Ballagh overwhelmed Loughgiel.

The Final
Oulart had 13 players who had been involved in Wexford’s All-Ireland senior and intermediate double the previous September 2011. Stacey Redmond was Player of the Match in Oulart’s impressive victory in the final. Teenage forward Aideen Brennan scored two of Oulart’s goals. The other was scored in the 23rd minute after Una Leacy latched onto a line-ball from the Hogan Stand side by Stacey Redmond, and, despite having the goalie and three defend ers on her case, found the roof of the net. Match referee was Owen Elliott from Antrim. OUlart’s success had its roots in the club’s absolute dominance of the under-14 Féile na nGael Division 1 series between 1998-2002.

Final stages

References

External links
 Camogie Association

2011 in camogie
2011